Qardash may refer to:

Nosratabad, Abgarm, Iran, also known as Qardash
Abdul Nasser Qardash (born 1967), Iraqi-born militant

See also

Kardash (disambiguation)
Kardashev (disambiguation)